Gródek Castle is a fortress situated by the river Smotrych.

History 
The castle was built in Gródek due to the necessity of fortification. The king of Poland, Sigismund I the Old, wrote a letter to his brothers - Mikołaj Herbut and Jan Swiercz giving them a privilege to collect customs. The castle had to be firmly reinforced, because the King named it as fortress.

In 1653 the castle was taken over by the Chmielnicki's Cossacks. They had no mercy for the gentry nor the burgesses. Anyway, their plunders stopped the horde which decided to rebel against Chmielnicki and come back from Podolia to Ukraine. It is speculated that their decision prevented Chmielnicki from creating a Ukrainian nation-state.

Manor house 
In the 19th century ruins of the old castle were rebuilt by the Russian general - baron Geismar who changed the castle into a comfortable, double-decker, classicistic manor house that existed until the Interwar period.

Castles in Ukraine
Buildings and structures in Khmelnytskyi Oblast